Wah Lai Estate is a public housing estate in Lai Chi Kok, Kowloon, Hong Kong. It consists of a total of two residential blocks completed in 2001.

Lai Yan Court is a Home Ownership Scheme housing court in Lai Chi Kok near Wah Lai Estate and within walking distance to Mei Foo station. Together with Wah Lai Estate and Nob Hill, it was formerly the site of Lai Chi Kok Amusement Park. It has three residential blocks completed in 2001.

Background
Although it administratively belongs to Kwai Tsing District, it is very near Mei Foo Sun Chuen, Lai Chi Kok rather than other parts in Kwai Chung. Sham Shui Po District Council requested the government to include the estate into its district, but there are still no changes in the boundary related to the estate. However, the government decided to include the entire Nob Hill, a private housing estate next to Wah Lai Estate, into Sham Shui Po District in 2007.

Houses

Wah Lai Estate

Lai Yan Court

Demographics
According to the 2016 by-census, Wah Lai Estate had a population of 5,711 while Lai Yan Court had a population of 5,562. Altogether the population amounts to 11,273.

Politics
Wah Lai Estate and Lai Yan Court are located in Lai Wah constituency of the Kwai Tsing District Council. It was formerly represented by Steve Cheung Kwan-kiu, who was elected in the 2019 elections until July 2021.

See also

Public housing estates in Kwai Chung

References

Residential buildings completed in 2001
Lai Chi Kok
Public housing estates in Hong Kong